Te Ao-kapurangi  (fl. 1818–1830) was a notable New Zealand tribal leader and peacemaker. Of Māori descent, she identified with the Ngati Rangiwewehi and Te Arawa iwi. She was active from about 1818.

References

Year of death unknown
New Zealand pacifists
Ngāti Rangiwewehi people
Te Arawa people
Year of birth missing
19th-century women rulers